The Millionaires' Mile,  Millionaire's Mile, Millionaires' Row, Millionaire's Row, Billionaires Row, Golden Mile or Alpha Street are the exclusive residential neighborhoods of various cities, often along one scenic strip such as a riverside or hilltop drive, or a wide city boulevard.

Characteristics 
Millionaires' Miles are often found in neighborhoods by the name of the Gold Coast, from Gold Coast (region), in West Africa. There is the Gold Coast of Long Island, Boston's Gold Coast, and Chicago's Gold Coast to name a few.

Millionaires' Miles are characterized by the presence of great houses in varying architectural styles. Depending on the location, these may be stately homes, mansions, townhouses, esoteric modern creations or other imposing designs.

United States

Some well-known Millionaires' Miles include the following:
 Alexandria Bay, New York: A chain of islands in the Saint Lawrence River, from Stony Crest Island to Heart Island
 Asheville, North Carolina: Biltmore Forest
 Atlanta: West Paces Ferry Road and Riverside Drive NW 
 Baltimore: North Charles Street and St. Paul Street 
 Baton Rouge, Louisiana: Dalrymple Drive and Lakeshore Neighborhood; Garden District
 Beverly Hills, California: Sunset Boulevard and Flats of Beverly Hills (north of Santa Monica Boulevard) 
 Birmingham, Alabama: Crest Road, Stratford Road, Argyle Road, and Redmont Road
 Boston: Beacon Hill, Commonwealth Avenue, the Back Bay
 Boca Raton, Florida: Between Federal Highway (US 1) and Ocean Boulevard (including Downtown Boca Raton)
 Buffalo, New York: Delaware Avenue
 Charlotte, North Carolina: Queens Road West and Eastover Road
 Chicago: North Burling Street, The Magnificent Mile, particularly north Michigan Avenue, Lake Shore Drive
 Cincinnati: Dayton Street Historic District.
 Cleveland: Euclid Avenue (historic)
 Dallas: Swiss Avenue, Strait Lane, Preston Hollow
 Deal, New Jersey: Ocean Avenue and surrounding streets
 Detroit: Palmer Woods, Strathcona Drive
 Fort Lauderdale, Florida: Bayview Drive, Rio isle, Las Olas
 Fort Worth, Texas: Crestline Road, Westover Circle, Shady Oaks Lane
 Golden Beach, Florida: Collins Avenue (State Road A1A)
 Hartford, Connecticut: Prospect Avenue (Governor's Row)
 Hillsboro Beach, Florida: Hillsboro Mile (State Road A1A)
 Houston: River Oaks
 Indian Creek, Florida: Indian Creek Island Road
 Indianapolis: Meridian Street
 Jacksonville, Florida: Ponte Vedra Boulevard
 Kansas City, Missouri: Ward Parkway, Janssen Place, Belinder Avenue
 Lafayette, Louisiana: West Bayou Parkway
 Lake George, New York: Along east and partially west sides of the lake
 Las Vegas: MacDonald Highlands east of MacDonald Ranch Drive, Grand Hills Drive in Seven Hills, Southern Highlands north of Golf Estates Drive, The Ridges north of Promontory Ridge Drive
 Laurel, Mississippi: Sixth Avenue and the lower numbered blocks of 5th Avenue. 
 Longboat Key, Florida: Gulf of Mexico Boulevard, Longboat Key Club
 Los Angeles: Bel Air, Brentwood north of San Vicente Blvd., Wilshire Boulevard east of Westwood Village, North Carolwood Drive and South Mapleton Drive in Holmby Hills, Hollywood Hills, Mullholland Drive
 Malibu, California: Pacific Coast Highway (State Route 1) in Carbon Beach.
 Meridian, Mississippi: Poplar Springs Drive, 2300 to 3500 blocks and 29th Avenue, the 2800 to 3500 blocks
 Memphis, Tennessee: Adams Street
 Miami, Florida: Brickell (Brickell Avenue) and Coconut Grove (Coco Plum)
 Miami Beach, Florida: Mid-Beach and South Beach (along Collins Avenue,) Star Island, Palm Island, and Hibiscus Island (all of the islands are on the MacArthur Causeway)
 Milwaukee: Lake Drive
 Minneapolis: The Cedar-Isles-Dean, Kenwood, and Lowry Hill neighborhoods of the affluent Calhoun-Isles community, located in scenic territory around the city's famous Chain of Lakes.
 Mobile, Alabama: Government Street
 Nashville, Tennessee: Belle Meade and Brentwood
 New Orleans: The Garden District, particularly St. Charles Avenue and its side streets, especially the gated Audubon Place
 New York City: along Fifth Avenue on the Upper East Side, The Hamptons (South Fork of Long Island)
 Newport, Rhode Island: Bellevue Avenue
 Oklahoma City: Nichols Hills, particularly Grand and Wilshire Boulevards
 Palisades Park, New Jersey
 Palm Beach, Florida: Worth Avenue and parts of South Ocean Boulevard
 Pasadena, California: South Orange Grove Boulevard
 Pass Christian, Mississippi: Scenic Drive
 Philadelphia: The Main Line, Chestnut Hill, Rittenhouse Square, and Society Hill
 Pittsburgh: Fifth Avenue
 Plaquemine, Louisiana: LaBauve Avenue and Bayou Road
 Portland, Oregon: Dunthorpe
 Raleigh, North Carolina: Holt Drive in Hayes Barton Historic District, White Oak Road in Anderson Heights, and Lakeview Drive in Country Club Hills
 Richmond, Virginia: Monument Avenue, River Road and Cary Street
 Richmond, Indiana: Main Street, on National Road
 St. Louis: Central West End near Forest Park, Lindell Boulevard, Portland Place and Westmoreland Place (both private)
 San Diego: Historic US Route 101 through Del Mar.
 San Francisco: Pacific Heights, Sea Cliff, St. Francis Wood
 St. Paul, Minnesota: Summit Avenue
 St. Petersburg, Florida and Clearwater, Florida: Gulf Blvd., Mandalay, Beach Drive, Snell Isle
 San Antonio:  Contour Drive (Olmos Park), Ivy Lane (Terrell Hills)
 Santa Monica, California: Montana Avenue (north of Montana) and San Vicente Boulevard (north of San Vicente)
 Springfield, Ohio: East High Street
 Tampa, Florida: South Tampa, including Davis Island and Harbor Island, Fishhawk (The Preserve, Chapman Crossing, among others), Stone Lake Ranch, Cheval
 Washington, D.C.: Massachusetts Avenue, Kalorama, areas around Washington National Cathedral, River Road (MD), Georgetown Pike (VA)
 Williamsport, Pennsylvania: Millionaire's Row Historic District, West Fourth Street
 Wilkes-Barre, Pennsylvania: River Street Historic District, Riverside Drive and South Franklin Street

International examples 

 Bacolod, Negros Occidental, Philippines: Burgos Street
 Brussels: Avenue Louise, Square du Bois
 Calgary: 'American Hill' (home to many Canadian oil tycoons), Mount Royal, Calgary
 Cape Town: Nettleton Road, Clifton, Cape Town
 Dublin: Shrewsbury Road, Ailesbury Road, Raglan Road, Dublin
 Hamburg: Elbchaussee, Harvestehuder Weg 
 Hobart, Australia: Sandy Bay Road 
 Hong Kong: Severn Road
 Jakarta: Kebayoran Baru, Menteng, Puri Indah, Pondok Indah, Pantai Indah Kapuk.
 London: Park Lane, The Bishop's Avenue in Hampstead Garden Suburb, the squares of Belgravia and Knightsbridge, Kensington Palace Gardens
 Lyon, France: Boulevard des Belges
 Makati, Philippines: McKinley Road in Forbes Park
 Marseille: Corniche Kennedy
 Melbourne: Towers Road, St Georges Road, Albany Road (Toorak). Monomeath Avenue and Mont Albert Road (Canterbury)
 Mexico City: along Paseo de la Reforma as it winds through Lomas de Chapultepec
 Montreal: Summit Circle area, Westmount; Golden Square Mile; Senneville
 Mumbai: Peddar Road, Malabar Hill and Altamount Road
 Paris: Parts of the 16th arrondissement
 Poole, Dorset, England: Sandbanks
 Starnberg (millionaires' town) near Munich, Germany: Seestraße 
 Surabaya: Many locations in West Surabaya (Darmo Permai, Graha Famili, Citraland, Satelit), Kertajaya Indah.
 Sydney: Wolseley Road, Point Piper
 Toronto: Bridle Path, York Mills, Lawrence Park, Forest Hill, and Rosedale in Toronto.
 Vancouver: West Vancouver and Shaughnessy.
 Victoria, British Columbia, Canada: Beach Drive in Uplands, Oak Bay.  Queenswood Drive in Ten Mile Point, British Columbia.
 Wellington, New Zealand: Oriental Bay Drive
 Winnipeg: Wellington Crescent, River Heights and Tuxedo
Zürich: Goldcoast (Switzerland)

References

Neighborhoods in the United States